William Marcus Henderson Rose (born 12 January 1957) is a former rugby union international full back who gained ten caps for England between 1981 and 1987.

Career
Rose made his debut in senior rugby while still at Loughborough Grammar School, his first appearance for Leicester Tigers came on 20 December 1975 against Bristol when he replaced club captain Robin Money who was injured, Rose played 7 times for Leicester in his first season scoring 70 points.  He played the first 9 games of the next season before university began, and similarly played the first three games of the 1977/78 season, scoring five tries in what were his final matches for the club.

Rose was selected by Cambridge University for The Varsity Match in 1979, 1980, and 1981.

Rose made his  debut on 7 March 1981 against  at Lansdowne Road, Rose scored a try and a conversion in a 10-6 win, but was unable to take up an offer of a place on England's 1981 England rugby union tour of Argentina as he could not defer his final university exams.  Later in March that year Rose joined Coventry, where he stayed until October 1983.

On 4 April 1987 Rose scored 17 points as England beat  to deny them a triple crown in the 1987 Five Nations Championship.

Rose provided colour commentary on the ESPN broadcast of the 1987 Rugby World Cup Final.

References

External links
 Marcus RoseSporting heroes 

1957 births
Living people
English rugby union players
Harlequin F.C. players
Leicester Tigers players
Coventry R.F.C. players
Cambridge University R.U.F.C. players
People educated at Loughborough Grammar School
England international rugby union players
Alumni of Hatfield College, Durham
Alumni of Magdalene College, Cambridge
Durham University RFC players
Rugby union players from Loughborough
Rugby union fullbacks